Platypelis tetra is a species of frog in the family Microhylidae.
It is endemic to Madagascar.
Its natural habitats are subtropical or tropical moist lowland forests, subtropical or tropical moist montane forests, and heavily degraded former forest.
It is threatened by habitat loss.

Sources

Platypelis
Endemic frogs of Madagascar
Taxonomy articles created by Polbot
Amphibians described in 2003
Taxobox binomials not recognized by IUCN